Figonero (foaled 1965 in Argentina) was a Thoroughbred racehorse who is best known for racing in the United States, where he set a world record for 1 miles in winning the 1969 Del Mar Handicap at Del Mar Racetrack in California.

Racing career
In October 1968, the three-year-old Figonero won the Gran Premio San Isidro at the Hipódromo de San Isidro in San Isidro, Buenos Aires. He was purchased from his Argentine owners in 1969 by Clement L. Hirsch, co-founder and owner of California's Oak Tree Racing Association. The horse immediately made a winning debut in the prestigious Hollywood Gold Cup for his new American trainer, Warren Stute. He was ridden to victory by jockey Álvaro Pineda who would be aboard Figonero for his world record win that same year.

Figonero raced in the United States for four years into age eight before being retired to stud.

Stud record
Figonero met with limited success as a sire.

References

1965 racehorse births
Thoroughbred family 10-b
Racehorses bred in Argentina
Racehorses trained in Argentina
Racehorses trained in the United States